Palampudur is a village in the Orathanadu taluk of Thanjavur district, Tamil Nadu, India.

Demographics 

As per the 2001 census, Palampudur had a total population of 1569 with 727 males and 842 females. The sex ratio was 1158. The literacy rate was 70.83.

References 

 

Villages in Thanjavur district